St Anne's Park railway station was a railway station in Bristol, England, on the Great Western Main Line to London. It opened on 23 May 1898, and closed on 5 January 1970.

Recent proposals have been made for the station to reopen as part of the MetroWest project to improve rail transport in the Greater Bristol area. In November 2020, the government announced further funding to investigate reopening the station.

Accidents and incidents
On 11 January 1966, an express passenger train ran into the rear of another at St Anne's Park due to a signalman's error. A locomotive was then in a sidelong collision with the wreckage. Nineteen passengers were injured. Diesel-hydraulic locomotive D1071 Western Druid was severely damaged; D 864 Zambesi was slightly damaged.

References 

Former Great Western Railway stations
Disused railway stations in Bristol
Railway stations in Great Britain opened in 1898
Railway stations in Great Britain closed in 1970